Carlos María de Pena Bonino (born 11 March 1992) is a Uruguayan professional footballer who plays as an defensive midfielder or left midfielder for Campeonato Brasileiro Série A club Internacional.

Club career

Nacional
De Pena made was born in Montevideo. He his official debut for Nacional on 19 February 2013, in the Copa Libertadores match against Toluca at Estadio Nemesio Díez, which ended in a 3–2 victory for the away side.

Middlesbrough
De Pena was involved in a car accident on his way to the airport before his reported £2.6m move to Middlesbrough. He is predominantly a left-winger but has been deployed in a variety of roles throughout his career, including left-back and centre-forward.

He made his first competitive debut for Boro on 22 September 2015 in a 3–0 victory in the third round of the League Cup against Wolverhampton Wanderers at the Riverside Stadium.

On 31 January 2017, de Pena was loaned to Spanish Segunda División side Real Oviedo, until the end of the season.

De Pena's contract was terminated by mutual consent on 19 July 2017, putting an end to a two-year stay in which he only made 11 first team appearances.

Return to Nacional
De Pena re-signed for Club Nacional de Football in January 2018. After one year at the club, he left again.

Dynamo Kyiv
On 10 April 2019, de Pena signed for Ukrainian Premier League vice champions Dynamo Kyiv as a free agent. With the club he won the 2019–20 Ukrainian Cup and the 2019 and 2020 Ukrainian Super Cups. On 17 April 2021, he scored the winning goal by penalty during the derby against Shakhtar Donetsk in the 2020–21 season at the NSC Olimpiyskiy. On 25 April 2021, he won the league with Dynamo Kyiv.

Loan to Internacional
On 1 April 2022, de Pena moved to Internacional and signed a loan contract until the end of the year.

Career statistics

Honours
Nacional
Uruguayan Primera División: 2014–15

Dynamo Kyiv
Ukrainian Premier League: 2020–21
Ukrainian Cup: 2019–20, 2020–21
Ukrainian Super Cup: 2019, 2020

References

External links
 Profile on Official website of Dynamo Kyiv
 
 
 

1992 births
Living people
Footballers from Montevideo
Association football midfielders
Association football fullbacks
Uruguayan footballers
Uruguayan Primera División players
Ukrainian Premier League players
Campeonato Brasileiro Série A players
FC Dynamo Kyiv players
Club Nacional de Football players
Middlesbrough F.C. players
Real Oviedo players
Sport Club Internacional players
Uruguayan expatriate footballers
Uruguayan expatriate sportspeople in England
Expatriate footballers in England
Uruguayan expatriate sportspeople in Spain
Expatriate footballers in Spain
Uruguayan expatriate sportspeople in Ukraine
Expatriate footballers in Ukraine
Uruguayan expatriate sportspeople in Brazil
Expatriate footballers in Brazil